HLA-B*82 (B*82) is an HLA-B allele-group. There is no current useful serotyping for HLA-B*82 gene products.
B*8201 was first identified by sequence analysis and appears to be derived by gene conversion between B*5602 and another HLA class I allele., later B*8202 was identified in a caucasian and was suggested to be ancestral to B*8201, as product between gene conversion of B*5602 allele and B*4501 allele. B*82 is more common in East Africa, Kenya and Sudan, the frequency of B*8201 is found in the peoples to the west, sporadically in Central and West Africa, B*8202 is found in Sudan and Saudi Arabia.

Serotype

Allele frequencies

References

8